William Josephus Stafford (1781–1823), also known as William S. Stafford and Jose Guillermo Estifano, was a sea captain and privateer during the War of 1812 and afterward.

Biography 
William Josephus Stafford was born September 12, 1781, probably in Frederick County, Virginia, the oldest of ten children born to Richard Stafford and Catharine Brobeker Stafford.  He married Mary Whipple October 1, 1805, in Baltimore, Maryland.  Mary was born about 1785 and was said to be the daughter of a William Whipple, and granddaughter of Abraham Whipple.  William and Mary Stafford had two sons—William Whipple Stafford born in 1806, and Francis Asbury Stafford born in 1808 —and raised their family in Baltimore.  Mary died July 22, 1809 in Baltimore.  William married secondly Mary Lauderman Jun 5, 1811 in Baltimore.  William Josephus Stafford died February 24, 1823, in Charleston, South Carolina.

He is listed as William Josephus Stafford in the Bible record of his parents, and William J. Stafford in the estate records of his parents, chancery court records, and the census.  Transcribed records for Baltimore show his name variously as William Josephus Stafford, William J. Stafford, William S. Stafford, and William L. Stafford.  Historical reports of the Battle of the Rappahannock refer to him as William S. Stafford, but the research of Feliciano Gamez Duarte shows that he used that as an alias, as well as Joseph Stafford and Jose Guillermo Estifano.

After his father died in 1808, William administered the estate and purchased 6 steers and a black boy from it.  Thomas W. Griffith filed a mortgage foreclosure on a piece of property in Baltimore City in Chancery County against William J. & Mary Stafford in 1817.  In 1820, he was named as a defendant with his brothers and sister in a lawsuit filed by their brother Joseph S. Stafford in the Frederick County, Virginia, Chancery Court.  Court proceedings continued through at least 1834, with no resolution given in court papers.

William J. Stafford was recorded in the 1820 Census for Baltimore, Maryland.

War of 1812 
William J. Stafford was the first of four generations of Stafford men to become a seaman, attained the rank of captain as commander of the privateer , a 12-gun schooner renowned for outsailing its foes during the War of 1812. Stafford and Dolphin carried Baltimore's privateering commission No. 2, and Stafford was responsible for the first prize captured on 26 July 1812, a British schooner valued at $18,000. Dolphin operated in the sea lanes from Baltimore to Buenos Aires and across the Atlantic to the coast of Portugal. She captured 11 British ships, nine of which were brought home to Baltimore.

On 25 January 1813, Captain Stafford captured the British ships Three Brothers and Hebe. Captain W. A. Brigham of Hebe was taken prisoner and treated by Dolphin's surgeon. He later attributed his recovery to the doctor's attentions and Captain Stafford's tender sympathy and goodness. Brigham actually published a statement in Baltimore acknowledging the kind and humane treatment received by him and his men. They were all given back their clothing and personal possessions, and all the wounded were diligently attended to. Captain Brigham made the statement: "Should the fortune of war ever throw Captain Stafford or any of his crew into the hands of the British it is sincerely hoped he will meet a similar treatment".  Captain Stafford was well known for his kindness of manner toward prisoners.

On 1 April 1813, Stafford was engaged by a British squadron commanded by Lieutenant James Polkinghorne blockading the Rappahannock River, in what is known as Battle of Rappahannock River. After a stubborn fight of fifteen minutes, Captain Stafford surrendered Dolphin and was taken captive, but on April 7 and his surgeon were paroled and sent ashore. The British took Dolphin into service as HMS Dolphin.

By November 1813, Stafford commanded another privateer that was attacked by the British in Charleston Harbor.

South American Venture 
Following the end of hostilities with the British in 1814, Stafford and other privateers sailed for Cartagena where they were arrested by Spanish forces who confiscated their ships and cargoes. The Spaniards stripped and beat the men with rifle butts before throwing them into prison. This led to the privateers siding with the Venezuelan rebels following their release and plundering Spanish interests. Charges were leveled specifically against Stafford in 1817 and 1818, including piracy of Spanish ships and smuggling of Spanish goods into the United States by various means. Commanding the new brigantine Patriota, built and outfitted in Baltimore, Captain Stafford sailed from Baltimore in early 1817.  Privateering in the Spanish waters of the Gulf of Mexico and the Caribbean, he adopted a Spanish name—Jose Guillermo Estifano, a rough equivalent of his English name. Records show that he used several aliases and had several ships at his disposal. His brother James Bruce Stafford sailed with him in the period 1818–1819, and commanded one of their prizes on the voyage to Baltimore and Savannah.

George Coggeshall, author of History of American Privateers and Letters-of-Marque wrote of his personal acquaintance with Captain Stafford and said that he was "a modest, unassuming, gentlemanly man; no one can, for a moment, doubt his unflinching bravery and gallant bearing, when he reflects on the many battles he has gained over the enemies of his country."    T.S. Currier, author of The Cruise of the General San Martin, said of Captain Stafford that he was a man who had all the features of the seasoned and unscrupulous privateer, though able to impose his personality upon a crew that was diverse in language and nationality, obsessed with booty, rebellious and often mutinous. Feliciano Gamez Duarte wrote in his doctoral thesis at the University of Cadiz that Stafford must have been a man of great courage with a strong personality and the ability to control his riotous crew by the power of his own will. Such was his confidence that Stafford often had his wife traveling with him.

References
 
 El desafio insurgente, Analisis del corso hispanoamericano desde una perspectiva peninsular:  1812–1828; Tesis Doctoral, Universidad de Cadiz; Feliciano Gamez Duarte, 2004; dialnet.unirioja.es/descarga/tesis/396.pdf
 Family Bible Records of Richard & Catharine Brobeker Stafford, Bible in the possession of Rita Kay Stafford Fawcett, Lake Alfred, Florida; transcribed by Casey L. Stafford, 2012.
 Dodd, Jordan, Liahona Research, comp.. Maryland Marriages, 1655–1850 [database on-line]. Provo, UT, USA: Ancestry.com Operations Inc, 2004.
 Register of the California Society of the Sons of the American Revolution (SAR), San Francisco, CA, USA, 1901.
 "Maryland Births and Christenings, 1600–1995." Index. FamilySearch, Salt Lake City, Utah, 2009, 2010. Index entries derived from digital copies of original and compiled records.
 Baltimore Patriot, 03-20-1823, Death Notices
 The Estate of Richard Stafford, Microfilmed records from the Mineral County Library, Romney, West Virginia; transcribed by Casey L. Stafford, 2007.
 MD Chancery Court; Date: 1817/07/29; 2070: Thomas W. Griffith vs. William J. Stafford and Mary Stafford. BA. Mortgage foreclosure on lot in BC. Accession No.: 17,898-2070-1/2 MSA S512-3-2138 Location: 1/36/2/ http://msa.maryland.gov/msa/stagser/s500/s512/html/s512n.html
 Virginia Chancery Court, Frederick County, VA; Date 1823-1834; Stafford vs. Stafford; transcribed by Casey L. Stafford, 2007.
 1820 U S Census; Census Place: Baltimore Ward 2, Baltimore, Maryland; Page: 62; NARA Roll: M33_42; Image: 43.
 Mayer, Brantz.  Baltimore:  past and present with biographical sketches of its representative men.  1871. https://archive.org/stream/baltimorepastpre00maye#page/n9/mode/2up
 Maclay, Edgar Stanton.  A History of American Privateers. 1899.  https://archive.org/stream/pivateershist00maclrich#page/n9/mode/2up
 Coggeshall, George.  History of the American Privateers. 1856.
 Head, David.  A Different Kind of Maritime Predation, South American Privateering from Baltimore, 1816–1820.  International Journal of Naval History, Volume 7 Number 2, August 2008.  http://www.ijnhonline.org/wp-content/uploads/2012/01/Head.pdf

External links 
 staffordgenealogy.blogspot.com

1781 births
1823 deaths
People from Baltimore
People from Frederick County, Virginia
United States Navy personnel of the War of 1812
American privateers
War of 1812 prisoners of war held by the United Kingdom